Bernhard Vechtel (31 July 1920 – 21 August 1975) was a fighter pilot in the Luftwaffe of Nazi Germany during World War II. He was a recipient of the Knight's Cross of the Iron Cross. Vechtel was credited with 108 aerial victories in a total of 860 combat missions, all on the Eastern Front.

Career
Vechtel was born on 31 July 1920 in Vohren, present-day part of Warendorf, at the time in the Province of Westphalia in the Weimar Republic. Following flight training, he was posted to Jagdgeschwader 51 "Mölders" (JG 51—51st Fighter Wing) on 2 May 1942. There, he was assigned to the 10. Staffel (10th squadron) which was subordinated to the IV. Gruppe (4th group) of JG 51. At the time, 10. Staffel was headed by Leutnant Horst Haase while IV. Gruppe was commanded by Hauptmann Johann Knauth and based at an airfield in Vyazma on the Eastern Front. During May, the Gruppe was briefly withdrawn from combat for a period of maintenance and equipment overhaul at Smolensk. They were then sent to Dugino where it was tasked with providing fighter cover over the left flank of Army Group Center in vicinity of the 9th Army.

On 30 July 1942, the Soviet Kalinin Front launched the First Rzhev–Sychyovka Offensive Operation with the objective to crush the Rzhev salient held by the 9th Army. Vechtel claimed his first aerial victory on 2 August 1942 over an Ilyushin Il-2 ground attack aircraft northeast of Rzhev.

He claimed JG 51s 8000th aerial victory of the war on 1 May 1944. He was awarded the Honour Goblet of the Luftwaffe on 3 January 1944, the German Cross in Gold on 28 January 1944, and later received the Knight's Cross of the Iron Cross on 27 July 1944. On 28 August, IV. Here, the Gruppe predominately flew combat missions to the area north and northeast of Warsaw.

Squadron leader
On 11 December 1944, Vechtel was appointed Staffelkapitän (squadron leader) of the 14. Staffel of JG 51, also a squadron of IV. Gruppe. He replaced Oberleutnant Horst Walther who was transferred. At the time, the Gruppe was commanded by Major Heinz Lange and was based at Modlin. Soviet forces launched the Vistula–Oder Offensive on 12 January 1945. Two days later, Soviet forces reached Modlin, forcing VI. Gruppe to move to Danzig-Langfuhr, present-day Wrzeszcz, Poland. On 25 March 1945, Vechtel was credited with his 100th aerial victory. He was the 99th Luftwaffe pilot to have shot down 100 aircraft. On 1 May, JG 51 received the order to relocate to Flensburg in northern Germany. Some of the pilots decided for themselves that the war was lost and deserted, including Vechtel. On 2 May, he refused to fly to Flensburg and led a Schwarm close to his hometown Warendorf near Münster. There, he arrived with two other pilots, a third pilot was shot down and captured by British forces.

Summary of career

Aerial victory claims
According to US historian David T. Zabecki, Vechtel was credited with 108 aerial victories. Spick also lists Vechtel with 108 aerial victories claimed in 860 combat missions, all of which claimed on the Eastern Front. Mathews and Foreman, authors of Luftwaffe Aces — Biographies and Victory Claims, researched the German Federal Archives and also state that he claimed 108 aerial victories, all of which claimed on the Eastern Front. However, not all of his claims can be verified through the archives.

Victory claims were logged to a map-reference (PQ = Planquadrat), for example "PQ 47682". These sectors were then subdivided into 36 smaller units to give a location area 3 × 4 km in size.

Awards
 Honour Goblet of the Luftwaffe on 3 April 1944 as Feldwebel and pilot
 German Cross in Gold on 28 January 1944 as Feldwebel in the 10./Jagdgeschwader 51
 Knight's Cross of the Iron Cross on 27 July 1944 as pilot and Fahnenjunker-Oberfeldwebel in the 10./Jagdgeschwader 51 "Mölders"

Notes

References

Citations

Bibliography

 
 
 
 
 
 
 
 
 
 
 
 
 
 

Luftwaffe pilots
German World War II flying aces
Recipients of the Gold German Cross
Recipients of the Knight's Cross of the Iron Cross
1920 births
1975 deaths
People from Warendorf (district)
Military personnel from North Rhine-Westphalia